Grupo Sportivo de Loures is a Portuguese football club located in Loures, Portugal.

History
Loures was founded on 13 August 1913 by local footballers who used to play in a plot of land called Casaréus in Loures. Their first ever game was a 3–1 friendly win over Sporting CP. In the 1950s, the club added facilities for cycling, athletics, table tennis, and roller hockey. In 1978 they added handball, and in 2004 futsal.

Colours and badge 
Castrense's colours are yellow and black.

References

External links 
 Official website
 Soccerway Profile
 FPF Profile
 Fora de Jogo Profile

Football clubs in Portugal
Association football clubs established in 1913
1913 establishments in Portugal